Seneca Niagara Casino & Hotel is a casino in Niagara Falls, New York. It was built by the Seneca Nation to compete with Casino Niagara and Niagara Fallsview Casino Resort in Niagara Falls, Ontario. Formerly known as the Niagara Falls Convention and Civic Center, it was sold to the federally recognized Seneca Nation of New York.

It is the largest hotel in New York state outside of Manhattan.

History
The Seneca Niagara Casino opened on December 31, 2002, the result of an $80 million transformation of the Niagara Falls Convention and Civic Center into a full-service casino. It features 82,000 square feet of gaming space with 2,595 slot machines and 91 table games. In 2021 influenced by Covid restrictions center create their own Social Club.

Restaurants
Western Door (Steakhouse)
Koi (Asian Cuisine)
La Cascata (Italian Cuisine)
Thunder Falls Buffet
Blues Burger Bar
Three Sisters Café
Morrie's Express
Tim Horton's and Cold Stone Creamery
Lounge 101

Shopping
Sky Boutique
Swarovski
Seasons
The NewsStand
Player's Club Store
Yankee Candle
Watson's Chocolates
TEN

Entertainment
The Seneca Niagara Casino & Hotel is home to the Seneca Niagara Events Center, a 2,400-seat theater that has hosted various performing artists, including Stevie Nicks, Tony Bennett, Aretha Franklin, Martina McBride, Trace Adkins, Lewis Black, Lisa Lampanelli, Steely Dan, Heart, Steve Miller Band, Huey Lewis and the News, Gretchen Wilson, Air Supply, Smokey Robinson, Diana Ross, Blondie, Jeff Foxworthy, Jay Leno, The Moody Blues, Grand Funk Railroad, Cheap Trick, Jim Gaffigan, New Kids on the Block, Seth Meyers, The Pointer Sisters, Chicago, The Go-Go's, Bobby Vinton, Tracy Morgan, Jackson Browne, Frank Caliendo, Michael Bolton, Alanis Morissette and more.

In addition, the Seneca Niagara Casino & Hotel has the Bear's Den Showroom, a 440-seat theatre that presents more intimate shows, such as The Goo Goo Dolls, Eddie Money, The Grass Roots, Lou Gramm, Gary Lewis and the Playboys, Little River Band, Mary Wilson, Richard Marx, and more.

After a year of being closed during pandemic, Seneca Resort in Niagara Falls start hosting online events like broadcasting concerts, sports events and interactive tournaments.

Expansion

In February 2008, the Seneca Gaming Corp. announced the expansion of the Seneca Niagara Casino & Hotel Property. It added more hotel rooms, and other amenities. It acquired Fallsville Splash Park, located next to the Seneca Niagara Casino, which was condemned by the State of New York and transferred to the Seneca Gaming Corporation. It was demolished for Phase 2 of expansion of the Niagara Falls casino.

Legal Issues

Adjacent properties owned by Seneca Gaming Corp.
Adjacent properties owned by the Seneca Gaming Corporation are not located on Seneca territory owned by the Nation, therefore it is technically illegal to put slot machines or provide for gambling. The Splash Park Property where Phase 2 of expansion is to take place is also located on non-sovereign land.

The former Convention Center is located on sovereign land, and the casino is operated by Gaming Corporation.

Taxing of non-sovereign adjacent properties owned by the Gaming Corporation
Use of the surrounding area adjacent to the Seneca Niagara Casino by the Seneca Nation for gaming has been the subject of a class-action lawsuit filed by attorney John Bartolomei in October 2010 on behalf of Fallsite LLC and residents who are angry over a 4% tax hike to be passed in 2011. The Seneca Niagara Casino is located on sovereign land owned by the Seneca Nation of Indians.

But, the land adjacent to the casino, including parking garages adjacent to Niagara St., the site of a former Pizza Hut on the corner of Niagara St. and John B. Daly Blvd., the Holiday Inn property on the corner of 3rd Street and Duggar Drive, the former Niagara Aerospace Museum in between 3rd and 4th Streets and Niagara Street and Wendel Way, the former E. Dent Lackey Plaza (now a parking lot) in between Wendel Way, Duggar Drive, 3rd Street and 4th Street, former private homes on 5th and 6th Streets, and the Splash Park Property on the corner of Falls Street and John B. Daly Blvd, are owned by the Seneca Gaming Corporation. The Seneca Gaming Corporation is non-sovereign and therefore taxable, but was left off the city tax rolls. If taxed, the corporation would be the largest payer of taxes in the City of Niagara Falls.

Other properties 
The Seneca Nation operates other gaming casinos on its property in New York state: 
Seneca Allegany Casino - This facility in Salamanca, New York, on the Allegany Indian Reservation, features a casino, spa, six restaurants and a new hotel completed in 2007.
Seneca Buffalo Creek Casino - Seneca Nation's newest casino is located in downtown Buffalo, New York.

References

External links 
 
 JCJ ARCHITECTURE ~ Architects for SNC & SAC

2002 establishments in New York (state)
Boxing venues in New York (state)
Buildings and structures in Niagara Falls, New York
Casino hotels
Casinos in New York (state)
Hotels in New York (state)
Music venues in New York (state)
Native American casinos
Seneca Nation of New York
Skyscraper hotels in New York (state)
Skyscrapers in New York (state)
Sports venues completed in 2002
Sports venues in New York (state)
Tourist attractions in Niagara County, New York
Native American history of New York (state)